Kargah may refer to:
Kargah, Larestan, Fars Province
Kargah, Neyriz, Fars Province
Kargah, Kermanshah
Karehgah-ye Pain, Lorestan Province
Karganeh, Lorestan Province
 Kargah Buddha, a rock-carved statue in Gilgit, Gilgit-Baltistan, Pakistan